"Coulter's Candy", also known as "Ally Bally" or "Ally Bally Bee, is a Scots folk song.

It was written by a former Galashiels weaver, Robert Coltart (1832–1880). The song was an advertising jingle for the aniseed-flavoured confectionery that he manufactured in Melrose, and sold around the markets of the Border towns. The recipe is no longer known, but the song lived on.

In 1958, a letter to The Weekly Scotsman reported that a man remembered hearing it from his grandmother, who in turn had learned the song in around 1845. It was collected in a children's playground in 1964 by James T. R. Ritchie, who published it in a book called The Singing Street. However, Norman Buchan published it earlier in 101 Scottish Songs (1962). He stated there:
"This song probably produced more correspondence than any other when I printed it in The Weekly Scotsman a few years ago. Robert Coultart – the 'Coulter' of the song – made and sold his own candy round all the country fairs and markets in the Borders... etc. I first heard it from Scots actor, playwright and folk singer Roddy McMillan." He also added one of the verses.

The word bawbee refers to a halfpenny coin.

Coltart died of a brain tumour, penniless, and was buried in an unmarked ("pauper's") grave in Eastlands Cemetery, in Galashiels.

In 2019, the Scottish Borders Council erected a statue in honour of Coulters Candy in Galashiels as part of a town centre regeneration project in advance of the Great Tapestry of Scotland Visitor Centre opening in 2021.

Lyrics
Ally bally, ally bally bee, 
Sittin' on yer mammy's knee,
Greetin' for a wee bawbee,
Tae buy some Coulter's candy.

Poor wee Jeanie's gettin' awfy thin,
A rickle o' banes covered ower wi' skin,
Noo she's gettin' a wee double chin,
Wi' sookin' Coulter's Candy.

Mammy gie's ma thrifty doon,
Here's auld Coulter comin' roon',
Wi' a basket on his croon,
Selling Coulter's Candy.

When you grow old, a man to be,
you'll work hard and you'll sail the seas, 
an' bring hame pennies for your faither and me, 
Tae buy mair Coulter's Candy.

Coulter he's a affa funny man,  
He maks his candy in a pan,
Awa an greet to yer ma,
Tae buy some Coulter's candy.

Little Annie's greetin' tae,
Sae whit can puir wee Mammy dae,
But gie them a penny atween them twae,
Tae buy mair Coulter's Candy.

The following verse is also sung, at least in Peterhead, Aberdeenshire since before the 1920s:
Coulter's Candy, a penny a lump,
'At's i' stuff tae mak ye jump.
If ye jump you're sure tae fa',
Coulter's Candy, a penny fur a'

Covers and parodies
Robin Hall and Jimmie Macgregor with The Galliards sang it on their 1961 Scottish Choice album, Decca, ACL 1065.

It was recorded by Donovan on HMS Donovan (1971). The Canadian singer Catherine McKinnon also recorded a version of the song on her album Voice of an Angel.

Hamish Imlach recorded a parody version, where a buyer complains about the poor quality of the candy. The song was also parodied on BBC Radio Scotland, by comedy group Flying Pig Productions in their show Desperate Fishwives, who related the song to the stereotypically poor Scottish diet.

A version by Scottish folk singer Watt Nicoll was commissioned by Allyballybees Ltd of Abington, South Lanarkshire, to promote their "Coulter's Candy" product and other confectionery. The song contained extra "New" and "Lost" verses.

A version of the song was released by The Kerries in 1967 on Major Minor Records 45 MM541, the song was produced by Tommy Scott.

Dawn Steele sang part of the song towards the end of Monarch of the Glen season 2, finale episode.

The Irish Rovers included the song on their album The First of the Irish Rovers (1966).

A Danish version titled "Storkespringvandet" was released 1965 by the folksinger "Cæsar" (aka Bjarne Bøgesø Rasmussen). Lyrics by Thøger Olesen.

References

External links
 Coulter's Candy
 Legend of sweetie salesman unwrapped
 Notes by MySongbook.de

Scottish folk songs
1840s in Scotland
History of the Scottish Borders
Advertising in the United Kingdom
Songs based on jingles
1840s songs
Scots-language works